is an annual mystery fiction guide book published by Hara Shobo. The guide book publishes a list of the top ten honkaku (i.e. authentic, orthodox) mystery books published in Japan in the previous year.

2001 
2001 Honkaku Mystery Best 10 (Hara Shobo. December, 2000)

2002 
2002 Honkaku Mystery Best 10 (Hara Shobo. December, 2001)

2003 
2003 Honkaku Mystery Best 10 (Hara Shobo. December, 2002)

2004 
2004 Honkaku Mystery Best 10 (Hara Shobo. December, 2003)

2005 
2005 Honkaku Mystery Best 10 (Hara Shobo. December, 2004)

2006 
2006 Honkaku Mystery Best 10 (Hara Shobo. December, 2005)

2007 
2007 Honkaku Mystery Best 10 (Hara Shobo. December, 2006)

2008 
2008 Honkaku Mystery Best 10 (Hara Shobo. December, 2007)

2009 
2009 Honkaku Mystery Best 10 (Hara Shobo. December, 2008)

2010 
2010 Honkaku Mystery Best 10 (Hara Shobo. December, 2009)

2011 
2011 Honkaku Mystery Best 10 (Hara Shobo. December, 2010)

2012 
2012 Honkaku Mystery Best 10 (Hara Shobo. December, 2011)

2013 
2013 Honkaku Mystery Best 10 (Hara Shobo. December, 2012)

2014 
2014 Honkaku Mystery Best 10 (Hara Shobo. December, 2013)

2015 
2015 Honkaku Mystery Best 10 (Hara Shobo. December, 2014)

See also 
 Honkaku Mystery Award
 Japanese detective fiction
 Kono Mystery ga Sugoi!
 Tozai Mystery Best 100
 The Top 100 Crime Novels of All Time

References

External links 
 Hara Shobo 
 Tantei Shosetsu Kenkyu Kai 

Mystery fiction
Top book lists
Lists of novels
List